Royal Air Force Great Sampford or more simply RAF Great Sampford is a former Royal Air Force satellite station located  west of Great Sampford, Essex, England and  south east of Saffron Walden, Essex.

History

No. 65 Squadron RAF used the airfield starting on 14 March 1942 flying Supermarine Spitfire V's before leaving to RAF Martlesham Heath on 9 June 1942 before returning again on 15 June 1942 for fifteen days. The squadron left again and returned on 7 July 1942 staying until 29 July 1942 when the squadron moved RAF Gravesend.

The following units were here at some point:

References

Citations

Bibliography

Royal Air Force stations in Essex
Royal Air Force stations of World War II in the United Kingdom